Beresford is a northern coastal suburb of Geraldton, Western Australia. Its local government area is the City of Greater Geraldton.

The suburb was gazetted in 1972.

Geography
Beresford is located between Geraldton's central business district and Bluff Point, and is bounded by Phelps Street to the south, Reilly and Wittenoom Streets to the southeast, North West Coastal Highway to the east, the Indian Ocean to the west and Davis Street to the north.

Demographics

Beresford residents had a median age of 38, and median incomes were slightly above average for the Geraldton region — $491 per week compared to $461 per week. The population of Beresford was predominantly Australian-born - 79.6% as at the 2001 census - while 4.30% were born in the United Kingdom. 5.97% reported one or more parents of Italian birth.

The most popular religious affiliations in descending order in the 2001 census were Roman Catholic, no religion, Anglican and Uniting.

Facilities
Beresford's southern section contains the Geraldton Entertainment Centre and a private school, Geraldton Grammar School.

References

Suburbs of Geraldton